Cyrus M. Running (August 2, 1913 - December 25, 1976) was an American regionalist painter.

Cyrus Maynard Running was born in Veblen, South Dakota. He was the son of Lutheran minister Alfred Running (1879-1970) and his musician wife, Julia Sophia Olson (1884 - 1935). Cyrus  Running graduated from St. Olaf College and the University of Iowa.  A student of Grant Wood, he is sometimes considered a regionalist. Much of his art focused on themes common to Minnesota or Norway. He was a member of the faculty of Concordia College in Moorhead, Minnesota, for many years.

References

External resources
Cyrus M. Running Gallery at Concordia College

1913 births
1976 deaths
St. Olaf College alumni
American Lutherans
American people of Norwegian descent
People from Veblen, South Dakota
20th-century Lutherans